Methodist Women's Hospital is one of three major facilities comprising the Nebraska Methodist Health System. The hospital is located in the Elkhorn neighborhood of Omaha, Nebraska.

History
In 2010, Methodist Health System opened Methodist Women's Hospital, thus launching the region's only medical campus devoted to women. More babies have been delivered at Methodist Women's Hospital than at any other hospital in the Omaha metropolitan area. In addition to the focus on women's health, this campus includes the area's largest neonatal intensive care unit as well as an emergency department and imaging and laboratory services for men, women and children.

See also
 Hospitals in Omaha
 Methodist Hospital (Omaha, Nebraska)
 Methodist Jennie Edmundson Hospital (Council Bluffs, Iowa)

References

Organizations based in Omaha, Nebraska
Hospitals in Omaha, Nebraska
Hospitals in Nebraska
2010 establishments in Nebraska
Hospitals established in 2010
Women's hospitals
Women in Nebraska